A jazz funeral is a funeral procession accompanied by a brass band, in the tradition of New Orleans, Louisiana.

History
The term "jazz funeral" was long in use by observers from elsewhere, but was generally disdained as inappropriate by most New Orleans musicians and practitioners of the tradition.  The preferred description was "funeral with music"; while jazz was part of the music played, it was not the primary focus of the ceremony. This reluctance to use the term faded significantly in the final 15 years or so of the 20th century among the younger generation of New Orleans brass band musicians more familiar with the post-Dirty Dozen Brass Band and Soul Rebels Brass Band funk influenced style than the older traditional New Orleans jazz.

The tradition blends strong European and African cultural influences. Louisiana's colonial past gave it a tradition of military style brass bands which were called on for many occasions, including playing funeral processions. This was combined with African spiritual practices, specifically the Yoruba tribe of Nigeria and other parts of West Africa. Jazz funerals are also heavily influenced by early twentieth century Protestant and Catholic churches, black brass bands, and the idea of celebrating after death in order to please the spirits who protect the dead. Another group that has influenced jazz funerals is the Mardi Gras Indians.

The tradition was widespread among New Orleanians across ethnic boundaries at the start of the 20th century. As the common brass band music became wilder in the years before World War I, some white New Orleanians considered the hot music disrespectful, and such musical funerals became rare among the city's white citizens. After the 1960s, it gradually started being practiced across ethnic and religious boundaries. Most commonly such musical funerals are done for individuals who are musicians themselves, connected to the music industry, or members of various social aid and pleasure clubs or Carnival krewes who make a point of arranging for such funerals for members. Although the majority of jazz funerals are for African American musicians there has been a new trend in which jazz funerals are given to young people who have died.

The organizers of the funeral arrange for hiring the band as part of the services. When a respected fellow musician or prominent member of the community dies, some additional musicians may also play in the procession as a sign of their esteem for the deceased.

A typical jazz funeral begins with a march by the family, friends, and a brass band from the home, funeral home or church to the cemetery. Throughout the march, the band plays somber dirges and hymns. A change in the tenor of the ceremony takes place, after either the deceased is entombed, or the hearse leaves the procession and members of the procession say their final goodbye and they "cut the body loose". After this the music becomes more upbeat, often starting with a hymn or spiritual number played in a swinging fashion, then going into popular hot tunes. There is raucous music and cathartic dancing where onlookers join in to celebrate the life of the deceased. Those who follow the band just to enjoy the music are called the second line, and their style of dancing, in which they walk and sometimes twirl a parasol or handkerchief in the air, is called second lining.

Some typical pieces often played at jazz funerals are the slow, and somber song "Nearer My God to Thee" and such spirituals as "Just a Closer Walk With Thee".  The later more upbeat tunes frequently include "When the Saints Go Marching In" and "Oh, Didn't He Ramble".

In popular culture
The Cincinnati Kid (1965), which takes place in New Orleans, begins with a jazz funeral in which the song "Oh, Didn't He Ramble" is played.

In the James Bond film Live and Let Die (1973), an early scene showed a secret agent being murdered under cover of a jazz funeral.

The 2010 HBO TV series Treme frequently featured jazz funerals as part of its depiction of the New Orleans musical landscape.

See also 
 Dancing Pallbearers
 Historic Cemeteries of New Orleans
 List of cemeteries in Louisiana
 Month's Mind, requiem mass played a month after death

References

Further reading
 "Funerals with Music in New Orleans", Dr. Jack Stewart, Save Our Cemeteries, Incorporated, & J. Stewart, New Orleans, 2004
 Turner, Richard Brent. Jazz Religion, the Second Line, and Black New Orleans. Bloomington: Indiana UP, 2009. Print.

External links 

 The Jazz Funeral　at New Orleans Online
 Let Me Do My Thang: Rebirth Brass Band – a documentary filmed and edited by Keith Reynaud, Jr.]
 Nick Spitzer, "Rebuilding the 'Land of Dreams:' Expressive Culture and New Orleans' Authentic Future" Southern Spaces 29 August 2006 http://southernspaces.org/2006/rebuilding-land-dreams-expressive-culture-and-new-orleans-authentic-future
 Nick Spitzer, "Love and Death at Second Line" Southern Spaces, 20 February 2004. http://southernspaces.org/2004/love-and-death-second-line
 "Jazz Funerals", Religion & Ethics Newsweekly no. 722 (Jan. 30, 2004) 
 Jazz Funeral of Anthony "Tuba Fats" Lacen, January 18, 2004
 Sakakeeny, Matt. "Jazz Funerals and Second Line Parades" KnowLA Encyclopedia of Louisiana. Ed. Joyce Miller. 25 Mar. 2012. 
The Journal of Latrobe, p. 191.  Description of a New Orleans funeral c. 1820.

Funeral
Culture of New Orleans
Funerals in the United States
Music of New Orleans
African-American Roman Catholicism
African-American Christianity
African-American music
Afro-American religion
African Americans and religion